Hypnotized is a 1932 American comedy film directed by Mack Sennett. The film presents various comic plotlines about a group of circus performers on a transatlantic crossing. The plots include a prize ticket winner being hoodwinked by a crooked hypnotist and his attempts to recover the winning ticket.

Cast
Charles Murray, Charlie O'Brien
Ernest Torrence, Prof. Horace S. Limberly a crooked hypnotist
George Moran and Charles Mack blackface minstrel performers the Two Black Crows
Wallace Ford, as Bill Bogard, the prize ticket winner
Maria Alba, Princess Mitzi
Marjorie Beebe, Pearl, the maid
Herman Bing, Capt. Otto Von Stormberg
Matt McHugh, Drummer
Luis Alberni, Hungarian Consul
Mitchell Harris, circus ringmaster
Nona Mozelle, as the captain's girl friend
Alexander Carr, as Abe Shapiro
Harry Schultz, as Ludwig, first mate

References

1932 films
Films directed by Mack Sennett
Films with screenplays by Felix Adler (screenwriter)
Films produced by Mack Sennett
American comedy films
1932 comedy films
American black-and-white films
1930s American films